Radosław Gil (born 25 January 1997) is a Polish volleyball player.

Career

Clubs
He was a player in Jastrzębski Węgiel youth team, he joined senior team of this club in 2015. In 2017 he moved to Slovenian club Calcit Kamnik.

National team
On July 2, 2017 Poland U21, including Gil, won the 2017 U21 World Championship after beating Cuba U21 in the final (3–0). His national team won 47 matches in the row and never lost.

Sporting achievements
 National championships
 2016/2017  Polish Championship, with Jastrzębski Węgiel
 2017/2018  Slovenian Championship, with Calcit Kamnik
 National team
 2017  FIVB U21 World Championship

References

External links
 PlusLiga player profile

1997 births
Living people
Sportspeople from Katowice
Polish men's volleyball players
Jastrzębski Węgiel players